The 2018 Birmingham Classic (also known as the Nature Valley Classic for sponsorship reasons) was a women's tennis tournament played on outdoor grass courts. It was the 37th edition of the event, and a Premier tournament on the 2018 WTA Tour. It took place at the Edgbaston Priory Club in Birmingham, United Kingdom, on 18–24 June 2018.

Points and prize money

Point distribution

Prize money 

1Qualifiers prize money is also the round of 32 prize money.
*per team

Singles main draw entrants

Seeds 

1 Rankings as of June 11, 2018.

Other entrants 
The following players received wildcards into the main draw:
  Katie Boulter
   Elina Svitolina
  Heather Watson

The following players received entry from the qualifying draw:
  Océane Dodin
  Jennifer Brady 
  Dalila Jakupović 
  Kristýna Plíšková

Withdrawals 
Before the tournament
  Madison Keys → replaced by  Donna Vekić

Doubles main draw entrants

Seeds 

1 Rankings as of June 11, 2018.

Other entrants 
The following pair received a wildcard into the doubles main draw:
  Eugenie Bouchard /  Dominika Cibulková
  Katie Boulter /  Heather Watson

Champions

Singles

  Petra Kvitová def.  Magdaléna Rybáriková, 4–6, 6–1, 6–2

Doubles

  Tímea Babos /  Kristina Mladenovic def.  Elise Mertens /  Demi Schuurs, 4–6, 6–3, [10–8]

References

External links 
 

2018 WTA Tour
2018
2018 in English tennis
Birmingham Classic